Hartwood is an unincorporated community in Tuscarawas County, in the U.S. state of Ohio.

History
A post office called Hartwood was established in 1900, and discontinued in 1902. Besides the post office, Hartwood has the Hartwood Methodist Protestant Church, founded in the 1830s.

References

Unincorporated communities in Tuscarawas County, Ohio
Unincorporated communities in Ohio